Bay d'Espoir Airport  is an abandoned airport located  southwest of the Bay d'Espoir Hydroelectric Power Station, in Newfoundland, Canada.

References

Defunct airports in Newfoundland and Labrador